Wings of Bornholm was a Danish airline operating from the island of Bornholm, Denmark. The airline was owned by Swedish Wings of Europe Sverigeflyg and 9 companies from Bornholm. Tickets went on sale starting on 10 July 2009 for the airline's first flight between Bornholm Airport and Copenhagen Airporton 23 August 2009. On 12 April 2010 the airline announced that it would cease flights on 30 April 2010.

Flights 
The company did not own their own aircraft. Swedish company Avitran was responsible for operating the flights, and ran them under the same codes and callsigns as Avitrans Nordic flights.

References

External links 
Wings Of Bornholm Company website
Wings Of Europe The main company - the official site
Sverigeflyg - The company behind Wings Of Europe - official site

Defunct airlines of Denmark
Airlines established in 2009
Airlines disestablished in 2010
2009 establishments in Denmark
2010 disestablishments in Denmark